Kshan Amrutache (Marathi: क्षण अमृताचे) is a Marathi album by Saleel Kulkarni & Lata Mangeshkar. The album was released on 7 July 2013 at Yashwantrao Chavan Stadium, Kothrud, Pune. The album was released by Pt. Hridaynath Mangeshkar. Saleel Kulkarni stated that it was his dream to work with Lata Mangeshkar.

Track listing
All songs were written by famous marathi poet ba.bh.borkar and music also is composed by Saleel Kulkarni.

References

2013 albums
Marathi music